Derek Schouman (born March 11, 1985) is a former professional athlete in the National Football League (NFL). He was drafted by the Buffalo Bills in the seventh round of the 2007 NFL Draft. He played college football at Boise State.

He has also played for the St. Louis Rams.

Early life
Born in Sandy, Utah, Schouman was raised in Ada County, Idaho. He attended Eagle High School in Eagle, Idaho, where he lettered in football and was a two-year starter as a tight end. As a junior, he was an impact player for the State Championship team. As a senior, he was a first-team All-Southern Idaho Conference selection and as a junior, he was a second-team All-Southern Idaho Conference selection.

College career
Schouman was a four-year starter at Boise State. Perhaps his greatest claim to fame was catching a fourth-down touchdown pass in overtime of the Broncos' win over Oklahoma in the 2007 Fiesta Bowl which set up the now-famous Jared Zabransky-to-Ian Johnson Statue of Liberty play for the winning two-point conversion.

Statistics

Professional career

Buffalo Bills
Schouman recorded 3 receptions for 19 yards as an H-Back before suffering a season-ending sprained ankle against the Cincinnati Bengals in 2007. He started fourteen games in 2008 and 2009 before being placed on injured reserve early in 2009 with a knee injury. The Bills placed him on injured reserve again in 2010 and waived him on September 8, 2010.

St. Louis Rams
Schouman was signed by the St. Louis Rams on November 17, 2010.

Washington Redskins
On August 10, 2011, Schouman signed with the Washington Redskins. He was released by the team on September 3, 2011.

Post-career 
Since retiring from professional football, Schouman has worked as a real estate agent for Amherst Madison in Boise, Idaho.

References

1985 births
Living people
People from Boise, Idaho
American football tight ends
Boise State Broncos football players
Buffalo Bills players
St. Louis Rams players
Washington Redskins players
Players of American football from Idaho
People from Sandy, Utah